The 1981 Men's World Weightlifting Championships were held in Lille, France, from September 13 to September 20, 1981. There were 194 men in action from 35 nations.

Medal summary

Medal table
Ranking by Big (Total result) medals 

Ranking by all medals: Big (Total result) and Small (Snatch and Clean & Jerk)

References
Results (Sport 123)
Weightlifting World Championships Seniors Statistics

External links
International Weightlifting Federation

World Weightlifting Championships
International weightlifting competitions hosted by France
World Weightlifting Championships
1981 in weightlifting
September 1981 sports events in Europe